Laclotte is a French surname. Notable people with the surname include:

 Étienne Laclotte (1728–1812), French architect
 Michel Laclotte (1929–2021), French art historian and museum director

French-language surnames